Theudebert was the eldest son of King Chilperic I of Soissons, through his first wife Audovera.  Theudebert was given command of Soissons in the early years of his father's reign.  When his father precipitated a war with his brother Sigebert I of Austrasia, Sigebert marched on his capital and took the city, capturing and imprisoning Theudebert.  He was out of prison a year later.  On the death of King Charibert I of Paris in 567, Theudebert invaded Austrasia and razed many cities. In 575, Theudebert was killed in battle by Guntram Boso in the civil war between Chilperic, Sigbert, and Guntram, king of Burgundy.

575 deaths
Merovingian dynasty
Military personnel killed in action
Year of birth unknown
Sons of kings